Abdul Samad bin Ibrahim is a Malaysian politician and served as Negeri Sembilan State Executive Councillor.

Election results

Honours
  :
  Companion of the Order of Loyalty to Negeri Sembilan (DNS) (2005)
  Knight Commander of the Order of Loyalty to Negeri Sembilan (DPNS) – Dato’ (2010)

References

United Malays National Organisation politicians
Members of the Negeri Sembilan State Legislative Assembly
 Negeri Sembilan state executive councillors
21st-century Malaysian politicians
Living people
Year of birth missing (living people)
People from Negeri Sembilan
Malaysian people of Malay descent
Malaysian Muslims